Neytal (also known as Naithal and Netal) is a village in Tavabe-e Kojur Rural District, Kojur District, Nowshahr County, Mazandaran Province, Iran. At the 2006 census, its population was 91, in 30 families.

References 

Populated places in Nowshahr County